Clydebank and Milngavie was a county constituency in Scotland. It returned one Member of Parliament (MP) to the House of Commons of the Parliament of the United Kingdom from 1983 until 2005, when it was redistributed to West Dunbartonshire and East Dunbartonshire as part of a major reorganisation of Scottish constituencies.

The similarly named constituency of Clydebank and Milngavie continues for the Scottish Parliament.

Boundaries
1983–1997: Clydebank District, and the Bearsden and Milngavie District wards of Barloch, Clober, Craigdhu, and Keystone.

1997–2005: Clydebank District, and the Bearsden and Milngavie District electoral division of Milngavie/Kilmardinny.

Members of Parliament

Elections

Elections of the 1980s

Elections of the 1990s

Elections of the 2000s

References 

Historic parliamentary constituencies in Scotland (Westminster)
Constituencies of the Parliament of the United Kingdom established in 1983
Constituencies of the Parliament of the United Kingdom disestablished in 2005
Clydebank